Lavonia Speedway is a dirt race track located in Lavonia, Georgia.

Lavonia is a part of a 3-track family in North East Georgia along with Toccoa Raceway and the very recently closed Hartwell Speedway. Before Hartwell's closure in 2023 the 3 worked together in an attempt to give drivers a shot at running Friday-Sunday while staying local to help the drivers out financially and not forcing them to travel as far.

History
Lavonia Speedway opened in 1971. The track was converted into an asphalt track in 1993 only to revert to a dirt track the following year.

Track Champions

Buck Simmons Memorial
Dirt Super Late Model legend Buck Simmons passed away in late-2012 leaving behind a very big lasting legacy. Ever since they've held a Dirt Super Late Model race annually with various organizations, currently the Carolina Clash Series holds the rights to the event. Originally the event was held at neighboring track Toccoa Raceway but in 2014 it moved to Lavonia where it has stayed ever since.

Zack Mitchell has the most wins in the race at 3 wins all coming in a Longhorn Chassis in 2019, 2021, and 2022 respectively. Longhorn also holds the most wins by manufacturer in the race at 5 in 2014 and 2019–2022, the only other time another chassis won the race was in the inaugural event in which Casey Roberts won with a Capital Race Cars chassis however that race was held at Toccoa Raceway.

Results

Rusty Jordan Memorial
In early-2021 Modified Street driver and defending champion Rusty Jordan passed away and ever since the track has run a $5,000 dollar to win race in that same class in his honor.

Results

References

External links

Buildings and structures in Franklin County, Georgia
Tourist attractions in Franklin County, Georgia
Sports venues completed in 1971